William Dean Naulls (October 7, 1934 – November 22, 2018) was an American professional basketball player for 10 years in the National Basketball Association (NBA). He was a four-time NBA All-Star with the New York Knicks and won three NBA championships with the Boston Celtics.

Naulls grew up in California, where he was named the state's Mr. Basketball in high school.  He played college basketball with the UCLA Bruins, and earned All-American honors as a senior in 1956. Naulls was selected by the St. Louis Hawks (known now as the Atlanta Hawks) with the ninth overall pick of the 1956 NBA draft. He played briefly with St. Louis before being traded to New York, where he spent most of his career. With the Knicks, he became the first African American to be named a captain of a professional team in a major American sport. After a brief stint with the San Francisco Warriors (now the Golden State Warriors), Naulls finished his career with Boston Celtics. In December 1964, he was part of a Celtics unit that became the first all-black starting lineup in the NBA history.

Early life
Naulls was born in Dallas, Texas, to Daily and Bettie (Artis) Naulls. During World War II, the family moved to Los Angeles when he was nine to escape racial segregation.  His father worked at shipyards in San Pedro, and his mother was a domestic worker. Naulls was a basketball star at San Pedro High, where he was named California Mr. Basketball in 1952.

College career
Naulls attended the University of California, Los Angeles (UCLA), where he played for the Bruins under future Basketball Hall of Fame coach John Wooden. In December 1954 during his junior year, UCLA won 47–40 over San Francisco, who were led by Naulls' future Boston teammates Bill Russell and K. C. Jones.  Naulls outplayed Russell in the Dons' lone defeat of the season en route to their first of two consecutive national championships.

As a senior in 1955–56, Naulls set the Bruins single-game rebounding record with 28 against Arizona State, and he finished the season with 582 field goal attempts to set the school's single-season record. UCLA won the Pacific Coast Conference championship and advanced to the NCAA tournament that season, while Naulls was named a consensus second-team All-American.

In his three seasons at UCLA, Naulls averaged 15.5 points and 11.4 rebounds per game. At the time his career ended, he was the Bruins' career leader in both points (1,225) and rebounds (900). He was inducted into the UCLA Athletics Hall of Fame in 1986.

NBA career
Naulls was selected by the St. Louis Hawks in the second round of the 1956 NBA draft with the ninth overall pick.  He called it a "culture shock" to see the segregation that existed in St. Louis, the likes of which he had not seen since he was eight before moving to Southern California. He spent just 19 games with the Hawks before being traded to the New York Knicks, with whom he would spend most of his career.

Naulls averaged a double-double (19.3 points and 10.7 rebounds per game) during his seven-year tenure with the Knicks, and he appeared as an NBA All-Star four times. The Knicks named him their captain in 1960, making him the first African-American athlete to hold the position for any pro team in a major American sport. In 1960–61, Naulls scored a single-season team record of 1,846 points, averaging 23.4 points per game. The record was broken the following season by teammate Richie Guerin. On March 2, 1962, Naulls scored 31 points and established another team record with his seventh straight game scoring 30 points or more. In that same game, Philadelphia Warriors center Wilt Chamberlain notched his NBA record 100-point game against the Knicks. Naulls' 30+ streak stood until 2010, when it was broken by Amar'e Stoudemire.

During the 1962–63 NBA season, the Knicks traded Naulls to the San Francisco Warriors, with whom he played briefly before being traded to the Boston Celtics.  Naulls spent his last three professional seasons with the Celtics, winning three consecutive NBA championships in the process. In December 1964 against St. Louis, he replaced an injured Tom Heinsohn to form NBA's first all-black starting lineup along with Russell at center, K. C. and Sam Jones at the guards and Satch Sanders at forward. That 1964–65 Celtics team was named one of the 10 best teams in NBA history during the league's 50th anniversary. The  Naulls finished his 10-year NBA career with averages of 15.8 points and 9.1 rebounds per game.

NBA career statistics

Regular season

Playoffs

Death
Naulls died on November 22, 2018, in Laguna Niguel, California, from respiratory failure due to Churg–Strauss syndrome, which he had been battling for eight years.

See also

Race and ethnicity in the NBA

References

External links

1934 births
2018 deaths
African-American basketball players
All-American college men's basketball players
American men's basketball players
Basketball players from California
Basketball players from Dallas
Boston Celtics players
National Basketball Association All-Stars
New York Knicks players
San Francisco Warriors players
Small forwards
St. Louis Hawks draft picks
St. Louis Hawks players
UCLA Bruins men's basketball players
20th-century African-American sportspeople
21st-century African-American people